Elections BC (formally the Office of the Chief Electoral Officer of British Columbia) is a non-partisan office of the British Columbia legislature responsible for conducting provincial and local elections, by-elections, petitions, referendums, plebiscites in the Canadian province of British Columbia. Its federal equivalent is Elections Canada.

Responsibilities 
Elections BC is a non-partisan office of the British Columbia Legislature responsible for conducting provincial and local elections, by-elections, petitions, referendums, plebiscites in British Columbia. Elections BC compiles and maintains a list of eligible voters as well as sets and adjusts the boundaries of electoral districts.

Elections BC is also responsible for regulating campaign financing and advertising and the registration of political parties. To retain their official status, political parties must file annual financial reports with Elections BC. Registration entitles parties to have their name on the ballot where they run candidates, issue tax receipts and spend on election campaigns. , 22 political parties are registered in British Columbia.

In advance of elections, a district electoral officer (DEO) and a deputy district electoral officer (DDEO) represent Elections BC in each electoral district and establish a temporary office to conduct the election, often shortly before the writ of election is dropped by the government.

Elections BC is subject to the following legislation: Election Act (1996), Financial Disclosure Act (1996), Local Government Act (1996),  the Local Elections Campaign Financing Act (2014)., and the Recall and Initiative Act (1996).

Scheduled election dates 

British Columbia was the first province to legislate fixed dates for elections. The next provincial election was set for October 16, 2021. On September 21, 2020, John Horgan called a snap election for October 24, 2020.

Referendums 
In 2015, Elections BC spent $5,372,380 to administer the 2015 Metro Vancouver Transportation and Transit Plebiscite, a cost of about $3.44 per voter. A total of 1,572,861 voting packages were issued and 798,262 (51 per cent) returned to Elections BC. About 62 per cent of Metro Vancouver voters rejected a proposal for a half-per-cent sales tax increase to fund a 10-year, $7.5-billion upgrade to transportation by TransLink. About 290,000 voted yes, while 467,000 voted no. About 38,393 ballot packages received by deadline were rejected because they did not meet the requirements of the plebiscite.

Candidacy fees and requirements 
A candidate is required under the Election Act to gather the signatures of 75 valid voters in their electoral district. A nomination deposit of $250 per candidate is required. Candidates who receive 15 per cent of the total vote receive a full refund. All others forfeit the deposit.

Chief electoral officers 
Chief electoral officers forfeit their right to vote in elections they oversee. They may not be a member of a political party or contribute to candidate campaigns.

The position of chief electoral officer was created in 1947.  Prior to that time, the responsibility for overseeing elections had been assigned to the registrar of the Supreme Court from 1871–1899, then to the deputy provincial secretary from 1899–1940. In 1940, the position of registrar general of voters was created to take over some of the deputy provincial secretary's duties. In 1950, the chief electoral officer was also appointed registrar general of voters.  The positions were subsequently held jointly until the position of registrar general of voters was abolished in 1995. In 1995, the chief electoral officer became an independent officer of the Legislature.

Current and previous officers
 Anton Boegman (June 1, 2018 – present)
 Keith Archer (September 21, 2011 – May 1, 2018)
 Harry Neufeld (November 7, 2002 – June 5, 2010)
 Robert A. Patterson (May 2, 1990 – June 6, 2002)
 Harry Morris Goldberg (April 15, 1980 – May 2, 1990)
 Kenneth Loudon Morton (June 1, 1968 – October 1, 1979)
 Frederick Harold Hurley (April 1, 1947 – June 1, 1968)

Election expenses 

Note: Enumeration or voter registration expenses were included in total election expenses up to the 2001 election. As of 2005, Elections BC excluded enumeration expenses from its calculation of total election expenses.

Candidates per election

References

External links
 

BC
Politics of British Columbia
British Columbia government departments and agencies